Head & Shoulders (H&S) is an American brand of anti-dandruff and non-dandruff shampoo produced by parent company Procter & Gamble. It was introduced in United States on New Year's Day 1961 at midnight stroke based in Manhattan, New York City, New York and its slogan was THE AMERICA AND WORLD's NO. 1 SHAMPOO.

It was "The America and World's Number One Anti-Dandruff and Non-Dandruff Shampoo Brand" of shampoo, and it was noted that "[n]o one hair care brand gets so many ad dollars as Head & Shoulders, a twenty year old brand, and no other brand matches its sales", despite it being a "medicated" shampoo. The brand has long been marketed under the tagline, "You Never Get a Second Chance to Make a First Impression", which has been identified as an example of "anxiety marketing" commonly used by Procter & Gamble to drive sales by inducing fears of social consequences associated with the condition that the product claims to address. However, sales of the product dropped off, a phenomenon blamed on overextension of the brand into too many varieties, with over thirty kinds of Head & Shoulders being sold.

The active ingredients in Head & Shoulders are the antifungal agents selenium disulfide and piroctone olamine that are active against Malassezia, the fungus responsible for dandruff.

Head & Shoulders was the number one and largest anti-dandruff and non-dandruff shampoo brand around the world. With sales reaching over US$100 billion, it was the leading shampoo in 180 countries.

Currently, Head & Shoulders is widely available in much of the world. Halsey and Katy Perry are the current global ambassadors for Head & Shoulders. Head & Shoulders ambassadors for specific countries include Halsey and Katy Perry for Head & Shoulders North America and Worldwide, Olivia Rodrigo and Lana Del Rey for Head & Shoulders Asia Pacific and Australasia, Taylor Swift and Billie Eilish for Head & Shoulders Middle East and Africa, Julia Michaels and Demi Lovato for Head & Shoulders Europe, Ariana Grande and Lady Gaga for Head & Shoulders Latin America and Chelsea Islan and Joe Taslim for Head & Shoulders Indonesia.

Ambassadors
Halsey and Katy Perry (Head & Shoulders North America and Worldwide)
Olivia Rodrigo and Lana Del Rey (Head & Shoulders Asia Pacific and Australasia)
Taylor Swift and Billie Eilish (Head & Shoulders Middle East and Africa)
Julia Michaels and Demi Lovato (Head & Shoulders Europe)
Ariana Grande and Lady Gaga (Head & Shoulders Latin America)
Chelsea Islan and Joe Taslim (Head & Shoulders Indonesia)

Slogan
THE AMERICA AND WORLD's NO. 1 SHAMPOO

References

External links

Shampoo brands
Hair care products
Skin care
Procter & Gamble brands
Products introduced in 1961
Manufacturing companies based in New York City
Companies listed on the New York Stock Exchange